

Events
Although various Triad-based groups had been in existence following the California Gold Rush, the first modern day Chinese-American Tongs are formed by Chinese immigrants for mutual protection in response to the Chinese Exclusion Act of 1882. 
Tony Matranga takes control of the New Orleans Black Hand after former leader Giuseppi Esposito is deported in 1881.

Arts and literature

Births
Arnold Rothstein, "The Brain" New York Crime Syndicate leader  
Max Zwerbach "Kid Twist", Eastman Gang leader and New York gangster 
February – Johnny Torrio, Chicago Mafia Don and Chicago syndicate leader

Deaths

References 

Years in organized crime
Organized crime